Luis Alberto Cabrera Figueroa (born 7 January 1994) is a Chilean footballer who plays for Deportes Copiapó.

Career
He signed with Deportes Copiapó for the 2023 season of the Chilean Primera División.

References

1994 births
Living people
People from Antofagasta
Chilean footballers
C.D. Antofagasta footballers
Audax Italiano footballers
Coquimbo Unido footballers
Deportes Copiapó footballers
Primera B de Chile players
Chilean Primera División players
Association football midfielders